The following is a list of National Hockey League (NHL) arenas. This list includes past, present, and future arenas.

FLA Live Arena, Madison Square Garden, and Mullett Arena are the only current arenas whose name is not held by a corporate sponsor; however, FLA Live Arena is only a temporary placeholder name until the Panthers can secure a new naming rights agreement. The Mullett Arena is a venue owned by Arizona State University, and only serving as an interim venue for the Coyotes until they can secure funding for a new larger arena. Climate Pledge Arena's name is corporately held by Amazon, who uses its naming rights contract to promote its climate change awareness initiative.

Current arenas

 § Underwent extensive renovations from 2018 to 2021, resulting in a completely new arena bowl and concourses within the original structure.
 † Underwent extensive renovations from 2010 to 2013, resulting in a completely new arena bowl and concourses within the original structure.

Map of current arenas

Future and proposed arenas

Former arenas

Defunct teams

Outdoor venues
The following are outdoor venues that have hosted any of the following events:
 Starting in 2003, the frequent but not annual Heritage Classic.
 Starting in 2008, the annual (except 2013 and 2021) Winter Classic.
 Starting in 2014, the annual (except 2021) Stadium Series. 
 In 2017, the 100th anniversary of the NHL, the Centennial Classic and 100 Classic.

Neutral venues

The following are neutral venues that have hosted games that counted in the NHL regular season standings:

See also
 List of U.S. stadiums by capacity
 List of European ice hockey arenas
 List of current National Football League stadiums
 List of current Major League Baseball stadiums
 List of Major League Soccer stadiums
 List of National Basketball Association arenas

References

External links
NHL arenas on Ballparks.com

 
National Hockey League
National Hockey League